The 1924 Southwestern Presbyterian football team represented Southwestern Presbyterian in the 1924 college football season. It was Jess Neely's first year coaching.

Schedule

References

Southwestern
Rhodes Lynx football seasons
Southwestern Lynx football